Arden municipality was a municipality (Danish, kommune) in North Jutland County on the Jutland peninsula in northern Denmark until 1 January 2007. The municipality covered an area of 228 km2, and had a total population of 8,513 (2005). Its last mayor was Hans Christian Maarup, a member of the Social Democrats (Socialdemokraterne) political party.

The main town and the site of its municipal council was the town of Arden.

On 1 January 2007 Arden municipality ceased to exist as the result of Kommunalreformen ("The Municipality Reform" of 2007). It was merged with former Hadsund and  Hobro municipalities, and part of Mariager Municipality to form the new Mariagerfjord Municipality.  This created a municipality with an area of 769 km2 and a total population of 43,049 (2005).   The new municipality belongs to the Region Nordjylland ("North Jutland Region").

Attractions
Rold Skov (Rold Forest) is the best known attraction in Arden municipality.

External links
 Mariagerfjord municipality's official website

Notable people 
 Thora Daugaard (1874–1951), women's rights activist and pacifist
 Jacob Barrett Laursen (born 1994 in Arden) a Danish footballer who plays as a left-back for Arminia Bielefeld

References

 Municipal statistics: NetBorger Kommunefakta, delivered from KMD aka Kommunedata (Municipal Data)
 Municipal mergers and neighbors: Eniro new municipalities map

Former municipalities of Denmark
Mariagerfjord Municipality